This is a comprehensive list of awards which Westlife has won or was nominated for since 1998.

BRIT Awards
The BRIT Awards are the British Phonographic Industry's annual pop music awards. Westlife has won two awards from six nominations. Westlife are the second most successful Irish act at the BRITs next to U2.

BT Digital Music Awards

Capital FM/Radio Awards

Clear Awards

Digital Awards

Disney Kids Awards

ECHO Awards
The ECHO Awards are a German music award show created in 1992. Each year's winner is determined by the previous year's sales. Westlife received one nomination.

G.A.Y. Awards

Goss.ie Awards

Heineken/Hot Press Awards (Ireland)

Hit Awards

Hot Press Irish Music Awards

Interactive Music Awards

IFPI (Hong Kong)

Irish Buzz WKD Awards

Meteor Music Awards
The Meteor Music Awards was an accolade bestowed upon professionals in the music industry in Ireland.

Mnet Music Video Festival
An award presented annually by CJ E&M Pictures.

MTV Awards

MTV Asia Awards
The MTV Asia Awards is an award show established in 2002, the show gives recognition and awards to Asian and international artists in achievement, cinema, fashion, humanitarian, and music.

MTV Europe Music Awards
The MTV Europe Music Awards "(EMA)" were established in 1994 by MTV Networks Europe to celebrate the most popular music videos in Europe. Westlife won 1 award from 3 nominations.

MTV Immies Awards

Online Music Awards

National Music Awards

Nordic Music Awards

Pepsi Chart People's Choice

NRJ Music Awards

Radio Music Awards
The Radio Music Awards was an annual U.S. award show that honored the year's most successful songs on mainstream radio.

RAV Awards

RIA (Singapore)

RTE Choice Music Prize

Smash Hits
Smash Hits was a pop music magazine, aimed at teenagers and young adults and originally published in the United Kingdom by EMAP.

Swedish Hit Music Awards

Ticketmaster Ireland

The Record of the Year
The Record of the Year was an award voted by the United Kingdom public.

TMF Awards
The TMF Awards are an annual television awards show broadcast live on TMF (The Music Factory).

Top of the Pops Awards

TV Hits Music Awards

Variety Club of Great Britain Awards

VIVA Comet

Weibo Starlight Awards

World Music Awards
The World Music Awards is an international awards show founded in 1989 that annually honors recording artists based on worldwide sales figures provided by the International Federation of the Phonographic Industry (IFPI). Westlife earned one award.

Other honours

Guinness World Records
The Guinness World Records honors the year's most impressive acts.

Wembley Square of Fame

See also

Westlife videography
Westlife discography
Westlife songlist
Westlife tours
List of best-selling boy bands
UK Singles Chart records and statistics
 List of artists who reached number one on the UK Singles Chart
 List of best-selling music artists in the United Kingdom in singles sales
List of artists by number of UK Singles Chart number ones
List of UK Singles Downloads Chart number ones of the 2000s
List of UK Singles Chart number ones of the 2000s
List of UK Albums Chart number ones of the 2000s
 List of artists who reached number one in Ireland
 List of songs that reached number one on the Irish Singles Chart
List of best-selling albums in the Philippines

References

External links

Official Westlife Website

Awards
Lists of awards received by Irish musician
Lists of awards received by musical group